Cotton is a 1986 debut studio album released in 1986 by the Japanese freelance jazz fusion drummer Akira Jimbo.

Track listing 
 "Red Lotus Man" – 3:36
 "Twilight Eyes" – 4:21
 "The Silent Road "Hellen"" – 4:29
 "After Midnight" – 4:54
 "The Light Around Us "Chris"" – 4:41
 "It's a Holiday" – 4:07
 "Blue Imagination" – 4:09
 "The Mood in the Melody" – 4:26
 "Hot Winter Night in the Valley" – 4:26

Akira Jimbo albums
1986 albums

Personnel 

 Abraham Laboriel — Bass
 Akira Jimbo — Composer, Arrangement, Drums (all tracks)
 Brandon Fields — Saxophone, Flute
 Bruce Fowler — Trombone
 Bryan Ferry — Steel Drums
 Carlos Rios — Guitar
 Don Freeman — Piano
 Greg Phillinganes — Piano, (track 4)
 Paulinho Da Costa — Percussion
 Paul Jackson Jr. — Guitar
 Rick Braun — Trumpet
 Walt Fowler — Trumpet